Fructuoso Orduna y Lafuente (1893–1973) was a Spanish artist. He was born in Roncal, Navarre, on January 23, 1893 and died in Madrid on August 28, 1973. He was renowned as a sculptor of "urban sculpture" and won several awards for his outstanding work.

Career
While he lived in Pamplona he obtained the assistance Floral of the Provincial Council moving to Madrid to perfect his skills with the sculptor, Mariano Benlliure. Between 1917 and 1922 he strengthened his training in Rome, sponsored by a grant from the same council. In 1962 he was named Fellow of Fine Arts in Madrid where he resided permanently. Years later he became the beloved Son of Roncal.

Sculptures 
Monument to Pedro Navarro, Count of Oliveto, 1928, Garde, Navarre
Monument to General José Sanjurjo, 1929, Navas de Tolosa Street, Pamplona
Monument to José María Méndez Vigo, 1929, Paseo de Invierno, Tudela, Navarre (placa)
Gable of the Provincial Council, 1932, façade of the Foral Provincial Council Palace, Pamplona
Monument to Juan Huarte de San Juan, 1933, la Baja Navarra Avenue, Pamplona (placa)
Monument to Valentín Gayarre, 1938, next to the local cemetery, Rocal, Navarre
Monument to Julián Gayarre, 1950, La Taconera gardens, Pamplona
Huesca, 1950. Image of Our Lord Jesus of Nazareth, for the Huesca Brotherhood of Veterans and former prisoners of Our Lord Jesus of Nazareth.
"Navarra", 1951, façade of the Foral Provincial Council Palace, Pamplona
"Reyes de Navarra", 1952, façade of the Foral Provincial Council Palace, Pamplona
Monument to Julián Gayarre, 1953, Roncal, Navarre
Huesca, 1955. Image of the Immaculate Conception, for the  Excmo. Huesca City Council.
Monument to César Borgia, 1965, Viana, Navarre
Monument to San Francisco Javier, 1967, Javier, Navarre
Monument to the Duke of Ahumada, 1969, Galicia Avenue, Pamplona
Monument to Alfonso XIII, s/f, University City, Madrid
Commemorative Plaque of Julián Gayarre, 1923, Casa Natal, Gayarre Museum, Roncal, Navarre
Sepulchre of Hilarión Eslava, 1929, Burlada cemetery, Burlada, Navarre

Distinctions
Third Place Medal in the National Fine Arts Exposition (1920)
First Place Medal in the National Fine Arts Exposition with the work "Post nubila Phoebus" (1922)
Elected Fellow of the Royal Fine Arts (1963)

External links
Biography of Fructuoso Orduna
D. Fructuoso Orduna's Work on the Real Cofradia de Nuestro Padre Jesus Nazareno de Huesca site(in Spanish)
The Navarre Museum and the City of Roncal collaborate in the creation of the "Orduna Fructuoso Documentary Fund"

Spanish artists
1893 births
1973 deaths